Allan Ross Ferguson  (born 1943) is a New Zealand botanist who has made significant contributions in the field of kiwifruit scientific investigation. 

Born in Morrinsville, Ferguson received a Masters of Science (first-class honours) in 1967, and a Doctor of Philosophy in cell biology from the University of Auckland in 1969.

In the 2007 Queen's Birthday Honours, Ferguson was appointed an Officer of the New Zealand Order of Merit, for services to the kiwifruit industry.

Selected publications

 Ferguson, A.R. (1984) Kiwifruit: A Botanical Review, in Horticultural Reviews, Volume 6 (ed J. Janick), John Wiley & Sons, Inc., Hoboken, NJ, USA. doi: 10.1002/9781118060797.ch1
 Ferguson, A.R. and Bollard, E.G. (1990) Domestication of kiwifruit. In: IJ Warrington IJ & Weston GC, eds. Kiwifruit: Science and Management. Wellington, New Zealand: New Zealand Society for Horticultural Science, 165–246.
 Ferguson, A.R. (2004) 1904– the year that kiwifruit (Actinidia deliciosa) came to New Zealand. New Zealand Journal of Crop and Horticultural Science 32: 3–27.
 Huang, H.-W. and Ferguson, A.R. (2007). Actinidia IN China: Natural diversity, phylogeographical evolution, interspecific gene flow and kiwifruit cultivar improvement. Acta Hortic. 753, 31–40 DOI: 10.17660/ActaHortic.2007.753.1 https://doi.org/10.17660/ActaHortic.2007.753.1.

References 

1943 births
Living people
20th-century New Zealand botanists
Pomologists
21st-century New Zealand botanists
People from Morrinsville
University of Auckland alumni
Officers of the New Zealand Order of Merit